Włodków Dolny  is a village in the administrative district of Gmina Góra, within Góra County, Lower Silesian Voivodeship, in south-western Poland. Prior to 1945, it was a part of Germany.

References

Villages in Góra County